5th Avenue is the fifth studio album of Christina Aguilar - a popular Thai artist. 5th Avenue represented her fifth studio album and also the 5th Avenue in New York. In this album, Christina has changed her appearance, she looked younger like a teenager. It differed from her almost previous albums. The change didn't help the album popular very much like her 2 previous albums. Her debut single was "Ro Eek Nid Nueng (Just a Moment)". The music video has presented the 5th avenue scene, it had great play in MTV Thailand and became most play thai music video that year. The second single was love ballad "Nueng Nathee (A Minute)". But the hittest single was " Oun Jai (Warmth)", it talked about someone who lived with us forever. The single has been covered several times by other artists.

Track listing
"Ro Eek Nid Nueng" (Just a Moment) 
"Nueng Nathee" (A Minute) 
"Phoo Chai Khee Luem" (A forgetive Man)
"Oun Jai (Warmth)" 
"Chan Mong Mai Hen Crai Leaw" (I Can't See Anyone)
"Sed Eek Lah" (Again)
"Ru Doo Kan" (Season)
"Rub Noi Noi Hai Mak Noi" (Get less, Give More)
"Ou Kab Chan Nah" (Stay With Me)
"Let's Say Goodbye"

References

Christina Aguilar albums
1999 albums
Thai-language albums